Free the Nipple is a 2014 American comedy-drama independent film directed by Lina Esco and written by Hunter Richards. Esco created the film to draw public attention to the issue of gender equality and encourage discussion over what she perceived as America's glorification of violence and repression of sexuality. When in post-production during February 2014, the film was picked up for distribution by Paris-based WTFilms.

Synopsis 
Led by Liv (Lola Kirke), an army of passionate women launch a revolution to "Free the Nipple" and decriminalize female toplessness. Based on true events, a mass movement of topless women, backed by First Amendment lawyers, graffiti installations, and national publicity stunts, invade New York City to protest censorship hypocrisies and promote gender equality legally and culturally in the U.S.

Cast 

 Casey LaBow as Cali
 Monique Coleman as Roz
 Zach Grenier as Jim Black
 Lina Esco as With
 Lola Kirke as Liv
 Michael Panes as Lawyer
 John Keating as Kilo
 Griffin Newman as Orson
 Leah Kilpatrick as Elle
 Jen Ponton as Charlie
 Liz Chuday as Blogger Liz
 Sarabeth Stroller as Pippy 
 Janeane Garofalo as Anouk

Advocacy 
Miley Cyrus, who had worked with Esco on LOL, came forward to support the film and a woman's right to bare a nipple in public. Joining Cyrus in her support of Esco and the film are Rumer Willis, Nico Tortorella, Lydia Hearst, Giles Matthey, Cara Delevingne, and Russell Simmons.

Release
The film was picked up by IFC Films, and it was announced on September 29, 2014, that Sundance Selects picked the film for North American release.

See also
 Free the Nipple (campaign), an advocacy campaign launched by Esco and named after the film

References

External links 
 
 
 
 

2014 films
Films set in Los Angeles
Films shot in Los Angeles
2014 comedy-drama films
American comedy-drama films
Films set in New York City
American independent films
Nipple
2014 independent films
2014 directorial debut films
2010s English-language films
2010s American films